Parkhomenko is a rural locality (a settlement) in Zaryanskoye Rural Settlement, Kalachyovsky District, Volgograd Oblast, Russia. The population was 427 as of 2010. There are 10 streets.

Geography 
Parkhomenko is located on the bank of the Volga-Don Shipping Canal, 56 km southeast of Kalach-na-Donu (the district's administrative centre) by road. Vodny is the nearest rural locality.

References 

Rural localities in Kalachyovsky District